Honeywood is a surname. Notable people with the surname include:

Brian Honeywood (born 1949), English footballer
Phil Honeywood (born 1960), Australian politician
Richard Honeywood, Australian video game localization director and translator
Varnette Honeywood (1950–2010), American painter and writer

See also
Honywood